Masters of Chant Chapter VIII is the eleventh album of band of Gregorian which was released on 30 September 2011.

Track listing 
 Pride (In the Name of Love) - U2
 Red Rain - Peter Gabriel
 The Rose - Bette Midler
 Early Winter - (Tim Rice-Oxley, Gwen Stefani) original by Gwen Stefani
 Human - The Killers
 Streets of Philadelphia - Bruce Springsteen
 Love Beats Anything
 Wake Me Up When September Ends - Green Day
 Everything is Beautiful - Amelia Brightman
 Wonderwall - Oasis
 In the Morning - Mammy
 Bravado - Rush
 Heaven - Bryan Adams
 River of Life (Amelia Brightman)

Certifications

References

2011 albums
Gregorian (band) albums